Lyambir (Lämbiŕ; , Lämbrä) is a rural locality (a selo) and the administrative center of Lyambirsky District of the Republic of Mordovia, Russia. Population:

References

Notes

Sources

Rural localities in Mordovia
Lyambirsky District